Vladimiro Américo Jorge Boric Crnosija (23 April 1905 – 29 August 1973) was a Chilean cleric and bishop for the Roman Catholic Diocese of Punta Arenas. He was born to Juan "Ive" Boric and Natalia Crnosija, both of whom were Croatian immigrants, and completed his primary studies at the San José School. He became ordained in 1930 and was appointed bishop in October 1949 by Pope Pius XII, becoming the first bishop of his hometown of Punta Arenas. He died in Santiago on 29 August 1973, at the age of 68, less than two weeks before the 1973 Chilean coup d'état.

He was the paternal granduncle of Gabriel Boric Font, the current president of Chile.

References

1905 births
1973 deaths
People from Punta Arenas
20th-century Roman Catholic bishops in Chile
Roman Catholic bishops of Punta Arenas
Chilean people of Croatian descent